María Seoane (born 25 January 1948) is an Argentine economist, journalist, and writer who has ventured into film. She has won numerous awards and published eight books on political issues in Argentine history. She was the director of LRA Radio Nacional from 2009 until her resignation on 21 December 2015.

Career
María Seoane has a degree in Economics from the University of Buenos Aires.

She has served as:

 National political editor of the journal El Periodista de Buenos Aires (1985–1989)
 National political editor of the newspaper Sur (1989–1990)
 Editor-in-chief of the Argentine section of the magazine Noticias (1992–1994)
 Deputy secretary of national political editing (from 1994)
 Director of the Clarín newspaper supplement Zona (1998)

She has published contributions in:

 The Mexican magazine Di
 The Mexican newspapers Uno Más Uno and El Universal
 The Turin magazine Nueva Sociedad

Academics
Seoane is a professor in the Journalism Master's program of the Chair of Journalistic Research at the University of San Andrés (Buenos Aires), and Columbia University (United States).

She has been an OAS consultant, and prepared reports on freedom of expression for the Inter-American Commission on Human Rights.

Militancy
In 1990s she joined the select group of the Journalists' Association.

During the government of Néstor Kirchner she was director of the magazine Caras y Caretas. In 2009, under Cristina Fernández, she became Executive Director of LRA Radio Nacional. She resigned the position on 21 December 2015.

She is a member of the group COMUNA, in favor of democratic communication.

Books
 Menem, la patria sociedad anónima, essay, Editorial Gente Sur, 1990
 Todo o nada. Biografía de Mario Roberto Santucho, Editorial Planeta, 1991
 El burgués maldito. Biografía de José Ber Gelbard, Editorial Planeta, 1998
 El dictador. Biografía de Jorge Rafael Videla, co-author, Editorial Sudamericana, 2001
 Nosotros : apuntes sobre pasiones, razones y trampas de los argentinos entre dos siglos. Sudamericana, 2005
 Argentina. El siglo del progreso y la oscuridad, Planeta, 2006
 El enigma Perrotta, Sudamericana, 2011
 Bravas. Alicia Eguren de Cooke y Susana Pirí Lugones. Sudamericana, 2014, 
 El nieto.

Notebooks of Caras y Caretas
 La noche de los bastones largos (2006)
 La noche de la dictadura (2006) 
 Evita, esa mujer (2007)
 Rodolfo Walsh, la palabra no se rinde (2007)
 La tragedia y la comedia en la Argentina (2008)
 El Cordobazo (2009)

Film
Seoane's first book, The Night of Pencils (La noche de los lápices), was adapted into a film of the same name by Argentine director Héctor Olivera.

She has ventured into directing with the documentary Gelbard, historia secreta del último burgués nacional (along with Carlos Castro, 2006), about the former Economy Minister José Ber Gelbard.

She also directed the 2011 animated film Eva from Argentina, focusing on the historical figures Eva Perón and Rodolfo Walsh.

Awards
 1991 Book of the Year (chosen by Argentine critics) for Todo o nada
 1994 Konex Award for Biographies and Memoirs
 1998  for her journalistic investigation published in Clarín on the 1976 military coup
 2000 Julio Cortázar Award from the Argentine Book Chamber
 Lifetime Achievement Award from the Henry Moore Foundation (2000)
 2002 Rodolfo Walsh Award from the National University of La Plata's Faculty of Journalism and Communication
 2003 Al Maestro con Cariño Award from

References

External links

 

1948 births
20th-century Argentine women writers
20th-century Argentine writers
21st-century Argentine women writers
21st-century Argentine writers
Argentine documentary film directors
Argentine newspaper editors
Argentine women essayists
Argentine essayists
Argentine women film directors
Argentine women journalists
Columbia University faculty
Journalists from Buenos Aires
Living people
University of Buenos Aires alumni
Argentine women economists
Women newspaper editors
20th-century Argentine  economists
21st-century Argentine economists
20th-century journalists
21st-century journalists
20th-century essayists
21st-century essayists
Women documentary filmmakers